This is a timeline documenting events of Jazz in the year 1976.

Events

April
 9 – The 3rd Vossajazz started in Voss, Norway (April 9 – 11).

May
 19 – The 4th Nattjazz started in Bergen, Norway (May 19 – June 2).

June
 4 – The 5th Moers Festival started in Moers, Germany (June 4 – 7).
 25
 The 23rd Newport Jazz Festival started in New York, New York (June 25 – July 5).
 The 10th Montreux Jazz Festival started in Montreux, Switzerland (June 25 – July 11).

July
 16 – The very first North Sea Jazz Festival started in The Hague, Netherlands (July 16 – 18).

September
 17 – The 19th Monterey Jazz Festival started in Monterey, California (September 17 – 19).

Album releases

Keith Jarrett: The Survivors' Suite
George Lewis: Solo Trombone Record
Air: Air Raid
David Murray: Flowers for Albert
Derek Bailey: Company 1
Jan Garbarek: Dis
Irene Schweizer: Wilde Senoritas
Toshiko Akiyoshi: Road Time
Albert Mangelsdorff: Tromboneliness
Leo Smith: Song of Humanity
Tony Coe: Zeitgeist
Ornette Coleman: Dancing in Your Head
Jaco Pastorius: Jaco Pastorius
Martial Solal: Movability
George Finola: New Orleans After Hours
Hamiet Bluiett: Endangered Species
Art Lande: Rubisa Patrol
Return to Forever: Romantic Warrior
George Adams: Suite For Swingers
Jean-Luc Ponty: Imaginary Voyage
David Friesen: Star Dance
Dexter Gordon: Biting the Apple
Joachim Kuhn: Springfever
Eberhard Weber: The Following Morning
Lew Tabackin: Dual Nature
Chico Freeman: Morning Prayer
Weather Report: Black Market
Charles Tyler: Saga of the Outlaws
Al Di Meola: Land of The Midnight Sun
Woody Shaw: Little Red's Fantasy
Stanley Clarke: School Days
Yosuke Yamashita: Banslikana
Ran Blake: Wende
Guenter Christmann: Solomusiken Fuer Posaune und Kontrabasse
Egberto Gismondi: Dança Das Cabeças 
Michael Franks: The Art of Tea
Hugh Masekela: Colonial Man
Hugh Masekela: Melody Maker
Ryo Fukui: Scenery

Deaths

 January
 14 – Juan d'Arienzo, Argentine tango violinist, band leader, and composer (born 1900).
 24 – Gösta Theselius, Swedish arranger, composer, film scorer, pianist, and saxophonist (born 1922).
 28 – Ray Nance, American trumpeter, violinist and singer (born 1913).

 February
 5 – Rudy Pompilli, American tenor saxophonist, Bill Haley and His Comets (born 1924).
 6 – Vince Guaraldi, American pianist (born 1928).
 12 – Skip Martin, American jazz saxophonist, clarinetist, and music arranger (born 1916).

 March
 14 – Junior Collins, American French horn player (born 1927).
 18 – Jim McCartney, English trumpeter and pianist (born 1902).
 19 – Paul Kossoff, English guitarist (cerebral and pulmonary oedema), Free (born 1950).
 26 – Duster Bennett, British singer and guitarist (car accident), Fleetwood Mac (born 1946).

 May
 14 – Keith Relf, English singer (cardiac arrest due to electrocution), The Yardbirds (born 1940).
 17 – Lars Gullin, Swedish saxophonist (born 1928).
 29 – Willie Maiden, American saxophonist and arranger (born 1928).
 30 – Rube Bloom, Jewish-American songwriter, pianist, arranger, band leader, singer, and author (born 1902).

 April
 7 – Jimmy Garrison, American upright bassist (born 1934).
 12 – Ted Buckner, American saxophonist (born 1913).

 June
 7 – Bobby Hackett, American trumpeter, cornetist, and guitarist (born 1915).

 July
 10 – Mike Pratt, English actor, musician, songwriter, and screenwriter (born 1931).
 12 – Buddy Featherstonhaugh, English saxophonist (born 1909).

 September
 8 – August Agbola O'Browne, Nigerian-Polish drummer (born 1895).

 October 
 3
 Victoria Spivey, American singer and songwriter (born 1906).
 Herb Flemming, American trombonist and vocalist (born 1898).
 11 – Connee Boswell, American singer (born 1907).

 December
 4 – Tommy Bolin, American guitarist (drug-induced suffocation), Deep Purple (born 1951).
 28 – Freddie King, American guitarist and singer (born 1934).

Births

 January
 10 – Freddy Wike, Norwegian drummer.
 23 – Harmen Fraanje, Dutch pianist and composer.

 February
 11 – Gretchen Parlato, American singer.
 20 – Ben Wendel, Canadian-American saxophonist, composer, bassoonist, and pianist, Kneebody.
 22 – Julia Biel, British singer, songwriter, pianist, and multi-instrumentalist.
 26 – Karl Strømme, Norwegian trumpeter.

 March
 1 – Andreas Mjøs, Norwegian vibraphonist, percussionist, guitarist, record producer, and composer, Jaga Jazzist.
 10 – Ane Brun, singer and songwriter.
 16 – Erlend Jentoft, Norwegian saxophonist and composer.
 27 – Tia Fuller, American saxophonist, composer, and educator.

 April
 10 – Jan Werner Danielsen, Norwegian singer (died 2006).
 17 – Kjetil Steensnæs, Norwegian guitarist.
 30 – Radek Nowicki, Polish saxophonist.

 May
 10 – Torbjörn Zetterberg, Swedish upright bassist and composer.
 20 – Ferenc Nemeth, Hungarian drummer and composer.

 June
 3
 Hilde Louise Asbjørnsen, Norwegian singer, songwriter, cabaret artist.
 Roger Arntzen, Norwegian upright bassist, In The Country.
 6 – Emilie-Claire Barlow, Canadian singer and voice actress.
 10 – Kinan Azmeh, Syrian clarinetist.
 17 – Kjetil Møster, Norwegian reedist and composer, The Core and Ultralyd.
 21 – Jarle Bernhoft, Norwegian singer, multi-instrumentalist, composer, and lyricist.

 July
 7
 Erja Lyytinen, Finnish guitarist and singer-songwriter.
 Orlando le Fleming, English upright bassist, composer and former cricketer, OWL Trio. 

 August
 6 – Jonas Westergaard, Danish upright bassist.

 September
 4 – Alex Pangman, Canadian singer.
 15 – Femi Temowo, Nigerian-born British jazz guitarist, musical director, producer and broadcaster.

 October
 1 – Ivar Grydeland, Norwegian guitarist and composer.
 7 – Pekka Kuusisto, Finnish violinist.
 19 – Jostein Gulbrandsen, Norwegian guitarist and composer.
 28 – Emma Salokoski, Finnish singer, composer, and writer.

 November
 8 – Eric Harland, American drummer.

 December
 6 – Ole Børud, Norwegian singer, songwriter and multi-instrumentalist.
 7 – Kresten Osgood, Danish drummer.
 17 – Andreas Schaerer, Swiss vocalist and composer.
 30 – Miguel Zenón, Puerto Rican alto saxophonist, composer, band leader, music producer, and educator.

 Unknown date
 Daniel Fredriksson, Swedish drummer.
 Jakob Høyer, Danish drummer.
 Tamar Halperin, Israeli harpsichordist, pianist, and musicologist.
 Yasuyuki "Yaz" Takagi, Japanese saxophonist.

See also

 1970s in jazz
 List of years in jazz
 1976 in music

References

External links 
 History Of Jazz Timeline: 1976 at All About Jazz

Jazz
Jazz by year